Derek Tomkinson (6 April 1931 – 28 July 2021) was an English professional footballer who played as an inside forward for Burton Albion, Port Vale, Crewe Alexandra, and Macclesfield Town. He helped the "Valiants" to win the Third Division North title in the 1953–54 season. He also won the Cheshire Senior Cup with Macclesfield Town in 1960.

Career
Tomkinson joined Port Vale as an amateur in 1949. He never featured at The Old Recreation Ground, and instead departed for Burton Albion in 1951. He returned to Port Vale in December 1952 to sign as a professional and made his debut on Boxing Day 1951 in a 4–1 win over Crewe Alexandra at Gresty Road. He played five further Third Division North games in 1952–53, as the "Valiants" finished second in the league. He scored five goals in 20 games in the 1953–54 title winning campaign, and played in the FA Cup semi-final defeat to West Bromwich Albion. He played four Second Division games in 1954–55, before leaving Vale Park for Crewe Alexandra. The "Railwaymen" finished bottom of the Third Division North in 1955–56 and 1956–57 under the stewardship of Maurice Lindley. He then moved on to Cheshire County League side Macclesfield Town in 1958, appearing as a regular first team player for three seasons and helping the "Silkmen" to win the Cheshire Senior Cup in 1960. He made 39 appearances for Altrincham during the 1961–62 season.

Post-retirement
Tomkinson retired to France, but later returned to England and in December 2013 was living in Cullompton.

Career statistics

Honours
Port Vale
Football League Third Division North: 1953–54

Macclesfield Town
Cheshire Senior Cup: 1960

References

1931 births
2021 deaths
Footballers from Stoke-on-Trent
English footballers
Association football forwards
Port Vale F.C. players
Burton Albion F.C. players
Crewe Alexandra F.C. players
Macclesfield Town F.C. players
Altrincham F.C. players
English Football League players